Accent lighting focuses light on a particular area or object. It is often used to highlight art or other artifacts. Common types of accent lights include wall sconces, floodlights, recessed lights, torchère lamps, or track lighting. The brighter light from the accent lamp creates visual interest to a room. Accent lights may also be used in practical applications to shine light on a stairway, such as in movie theaters, or to light walkways.

Some accent lights aren't made to shine on a particular object, but are themselves a piece of art with a self-contained light source. Often made with Tiffany glass, these serve as a piece of functional decor for a home. 

Accent lights can also be used outdoors as guides for pathways or to spotlight garden art.

References

Lighting
Light fixtures